Lawal Murtadah Oladipupo (born 15 March 1995) is a Nigerian footballer who plays as a centre back.

Club career
Oladipupoh has played for no less than four Nigerian clubs, he started with Babanawa FC, Patrick Ovie FC and later New Generation Football Academy, in the summer of 2014 he joined to Jalingo-based Nigeria Professional Football League club Taraba F.C.

He moved to Northern Cyprus where he played at Çetinkaya 2015–2016, Baf Ülkü Yurdu 2016-2017 and Göcmenköy IYSK 2019.

References

External links
Lawal Murtadah Oladipupo at KTFF
Press Reader
 En çok Nijeryalı tercih edildi Kaynak: En çok Nijeryalı tercih edildi  
Süper Ligin yabancı futbolcular belli oldu
Yabancılar tamam

1995 births
Association football defenders
Living people
Nigerian expatriate footballers
Expatriate footballers in Northern Cyprus
Nigerian expatriate sportspeople in Northern Cyprus
Nigerian footballers